Huberantha korinti is a species of plant in the Annonaceae family. It is native to South Asia.

Uses
Its fruits are edible.

References

External links
 http://www.biotik.org/india/species/p/polykori/polykori_en.html
 http://indiabiodiversity.org/species/show/17388
 http://hub.hku.hk/handle/10722/111927

Annonaceae
Flora of Sri Lanka
Flora of India (region)
Plants described in 1817
Taxa named by Michel Félix Dunal
korinti